is a subprefecture of Hokkaido Prefecture, Japan. The west side of the Hidaka mountains occupies most of the area. Hidaka is sparsely populated and has many of Hokkaido's natural resources.  The governmental office is located in Urakawa.

History 
1897: Urakawa Subprefecture established.
1932: Urakawa Subprefecture renamed Hidaka Subprefecture.

The name Hidaka ("sun high") is derived from the province of the same name established in 1869, which in turn was named after an unknown place in the Nihonshoki, a history book written in 720.  There is no direct connection between the Hidaka of the Nihonshoki and the modern Hidaka.

Geography 
Located on the south-east coast of Hokkaido, Hidaka Subprefecture has an area of  making it the 7th largest subprefecture in the prefecture and 5.8% of Hokkaido's total area. More than 80% of the area is covered with forest.

The prefecture borders Tokachi Subprefecture to the north across the Hidaka Mountains. To the west is Iburi Subprefecture. The south side of the subprefecture is its coast on the Pacific Ocean.

These mountains are part of the Hidaka Sanmyaku-Erimo Quasi-National Park, which include Mount Apoi alpine vegetation community and Cape Erimo coast landscape. These areas boast wildlife such as brown bear, sika deer, and common seal.

Municipalities

Mergers

Demographics
The population of Hidaka Subprefecture is 81,407 in 33,996 households. In the 2005 census, this represents 1.4% of the total population of Hokkaido. The population of Hidaka peaked in 1960. The current population is down 4,613 from the last census in 2005.

References

External links

Official website 
 

Subprefectures in Hokkaido